Sierra de Gorbea is a large lava field in the Chilean Andes that has been dated 4.7±0.5 Ma and 5.2±0.5 Ma by potassium argon dating. The lavas are dacitic to basaltic andesite with rhyolitic inclusions and no vent is evident.

References

Volcanoes of Chile
Lava fields